The bronze-winged duck (Speculanas specularis) also known as the spectacled duck, is a dabbling duck and the sole member of its genus Speculanas. It is often placed in Anas with most other dabbling ducks, but its closest relative is either the crested duck or the Brazilian duck, which likewise form monotypic genera. Together they belong to a South American lineage which diverged early from the other dabbling ducks and may include the steamer ducks.

Named after the "bronze" speculum this species is also known as "pato perro" or "dog-duck" after the harsh barking call of the female.

The bronze-winged duck lives among forested rivers and fast-flowing streams on the lower slopes of the South American Andes, in central and southern Chile and adjacent parts of Argentina.

The sexes are alike.

As noted by Johnsgard (2010): "Most observers agree that heavily forested rivers that are relatively swift-flowing are the preferred habitat of this species, although they also occur on slow-moving rivers and on pools or ponds of the adjoining forest areas. They are said to consume both vegetable and animal materials, and have been observed eating small snails that abound on stony shingle beaches. Stomach remains from two birds that were examined contained the seeds of water crowfoot (Batrachium), water milfoil (Myriophyllum), and a bulrush, leaves of water crowfoot, foliage and seeds of a pondweed, and caddis fly larvae as well as a few other aquatic insect remains (Phillips, 1922–26). In captivity at least the birds seem to spend a good deal of time on land and have not been observed diving for food."

References

bronze-winged duck
bronze-winged duck
Birds of Patagonia
Birds of Tierra del Fuego
bronze-winged duck
bronze-winged duck